The Advanced Light Torpedo (TAL) Shyena (Sanskrit: श्येन, "Falcon or Hawk") is the first indigenous advanced lightweight anti-submarine torpedo of India, developed by the Naval Science and Technological Laboratory (NSTL) of the Defence Research and Development Organisation (DRDO) for the Indian Navy. The lightweight torpedo can be launched by ships, submarines, helicopters and Ilyushin Il-38, named after the divine hawk identified with Agni.

Introduction
Shyena is a processor based torpedo which incorporates solid-state electronics, digital technology and has been equipped with an integrated Active/Passive sensor package for homing. It is designed to be capable of being launched from both a helicopter or from a triple-tube launcher on surface vessels. Its key design feature are maneuverability and ability to transition from warm to cold medium to ensure a hunt and kill. The development period of the torpedo was quite long, starting in the 1990s, and was inducted into the Indian Navy on 3 March 2012, when the Defence Minister A.K. Antony handed over the first consignment of TAL to the Navy in Hyderabad.

Design and development

Development of this missile was started by the Naval Science and Technological Laboratory (NSTL) in 1990s, under the Advanced Experimental Torpedo (TAE) program. It is an advanced capability torpedo and is heavily based on the Whitehead A244-S torpedo. NSTL had faced a difficult task of developing a torpedo which could sustain its efficiency, in particular the maneuverability and structural integrity while travelling from the air medium to water after being launched from air. The computers perform their respective tasks, which are the successful launch of the torpedo, the homing of the target and its control and finally the recording of the data for analysis.

Shyena is electrically propelled, and can target submarines with a speed of 33 knots with endurance of six minutes in both shallow and deep waters. It can operate at depths of a few hundred metres and has self-homing, i.e. it can home in on targets by passive/active homing and explode on impact. Once launched, it can perform pre-programmed search patterns for available targets. The torpedo weighs around 220 kg.

Deployment
By 1998, Shyena was ready for trials, and it was tested 24 times by the NSTL from 1998 to 2000. During trials, thrust was laid on monitoring of various factors through four computers fitted on board Shyena. User evaluation tests with designed and engineered models of the TAL took place in 2003–2005, following which the Navy was convinced of the system's capabilities, and the fact that 95 per cent of the components were indigenous except a few integrated circuits and sensors, and ordered 25 units, and is likely to order more. The TAL is currently being manufactured by Bharat Dynamics Limited at its Visakhapatnam unit.

On 8 March 2021, Indian Navy successfully cleared its maiden flight trial with a parachute system from the Ilyushin Il-38 maritime aircraft.

Export

In March 2017, India signed a $37.9 million deal to supply Shyena to the Myanmar Navy. The first batch of these torpedoes were delivered in July 2019.

BDL signed a third and fourth export contract for the Shyena torpedo in 2019 to an undisclosed friendly country. The order is planned to be executed in 2020–21.

Operators

Indian Navy

Myanmar Navy

Coverage
In his book "Naval Institute Guide to Combat Fleets of the World: Their Ships, Aircraft, and Systems", Eric Wertheim has described the Shyena as an up-and-coming torpedo developed by the DRDO.

Pursuit and Promotion of Science, a report published by Indian National Science Academy mentions Shyena as an advanced experimental torpedo.

See also
 APR-3E torpedo - Russian equivalent
 A244-S - Italian equivalent
 Mark 54 Lightweight Torpedo - US Navy's equivalent
 MU90 Impact - French/Italian equivalent
 Sting Ray (torpedo) - British equivalent
 Yu-7 torpedo - Chinese equivalent
 K745 Chung Sang Eo - South Korean equivalent
 Type 97 light weight torpedo (G-RX4) - Japanese equivalent

References

Torpedoes
Navy
Indian Navy
Aerial torpedoes
Military equipment introduced in the 2010s